I. japonica  may refer to:
 Inioteuthis japonica, a bobtail squid species native to the western Pacific Ocean, specifically the waters off China, Taiwan and southern Japan
 Iris japonica, a plant species native of China

See also
 Japonica (disambiguation)